The non-marine molluscs of Lebanon are a part of the molluscan fauna of Lebanon. A number of species of non-marine molluscs are found in the wild in Lebanon. In addition, a number of gastropod species are reared in captivity in greenhouses, aquaria and terraria.

Freshwater gastropods 

Neritidae
 Theodoxus jordani (Sowerby, 1832)

Melanopsidae
 Melanopsis buccinoidea (Olivier, 1801)

Cochliopidae
 Eupaludestrina longiscata (Bourguignat, 1856)

Hydrobiidae
 Belgrandiella libanica Schütt, 1993
 Islamia gaillardoti (Germain, 1911)
 Radomaniola gaillardotii (Bourguignat, 1856)

Tateidae
 Potamopyrgus antipodarum (J. E. Gray, 1843)

Bithyniidae
 Pseudobithynia amiqensis Glöer & Bößneck, 2007
 Pseudobithynia kathrini Glöer & Bößneck, 2007
 Pseudobithynia levantica Glöer & Bößneck, 2007

Valvatidae
 Valvata saulcyi (Bourguignat, 1853)

Lymnaeidae
 Galba truncatula (O. F. Müller, 1774)
 Lymnaea stagnalis (Linnaeus, 1758)
 Radix auricularia (Linnaeus, 1758)
 Stagnicola cf. berlani (Bourguignat, 1870)

Physidae
 Physella acuta (Draparnaud, 1805)

Planorbidae
 Ancylus fluviatilis (O. F. Müller, 1774)
 Gyraulus bekaensis Glöer & Bößneck, 2007
 Gyraulus homsensis (Dautzenberg, 1894)
 Gyraulus piscinarum (Bourguignat, 1852)
 Planorbis carinatus O. F. Müller, 1774

Land gastropods 
Succineidae
 Oxyloma cf. elegans (Risso, 1826)

Lauriidae
 Lauria cylindracea (Da Costa, 1778)

Orculidae
 Orculella sirianocoriensis libanotica (Tristram, 1865)
 Orculella mesopotamica riedeli Hausdorf, 1996

Enidae
 Buliminus damascensis (Pallary, 1929)
 Euchondrus septemdentatus (Roth, 1839)
 Euchondrus cf. ledereri (L. Pfeiffer, 1868)
 Pene bulimoides (L. Pfeiffer, 1842)
 Pene kotschyi (L. Pfeiffer, 1854)
 Pene louisi (Germain, 1911)
 Pene syriacus (L. Pfeiffer, 1864)
 Turanena benjamitica (Benson, 1859)

Pleurodiscidae
 Pleurodiscus erdelii (Roth, 1839)

Clausiliidae
 Cristataria albersi (Charpentier, 1852)
 Cristataria boissieri (Charpentier, 1847)
 Cristataria cylindrelliformis (Bourguignat, 1855)
 Cristataria delesserti (Bourguignat, 1853)
 Cristataria dutaillyana (Bourguignat, 1868)
 Cristataria florieni (Pallary, 1939)
 Cristataria hedenborgi (L. Pfeiffer, 1849)
 Cristataria porrecta (Rossmässler, 1857)
 Cristataria staudingeri (O. Boettger, 1890)
 Cristataria strangulata (L. Pfeiffer, 1841)
 Cristataria vesicalis (Rossmässler, 1857)
 Cristataria zelebori (Rossmässler, 1856)
 Cristataria zilchi H. Nordsieck, 1971
 Elia moesta (Rossmässler, 1839)

Oxychilidae
 Eopolita protensa jebusitica (Roth, 1855)
 Libania saulcyi (Bourguignat, 1852)
 Oxychilus renanianus (Pallary, 1939)
 Oxychilus syriacus (Kobelt, 1879)

Limacidae
 Limacus flavus (Linnaeus, 1758)

Agriolimacidae
 Deroceras berytensis (Bourguignat, 1852)
 Deroceras libanoticum (Pollonera, 1909)

Geomitridae
 Cochlicella acuta (O. F. Müller, 1774)
 Xeropicta krynickii (Krynicki, 1833)

Hygromiidae
 Metafruticicola berytensis (L. Pfeiffer, 1841)
 Metafruticicola fourousi (Bourguignat, 1863)
 Monacha bari Forcart 1981
 Monacha cf. compingtae (Pallary, 1929)
 Monacha crispulata (Mousson, 1861)
 Monacha nummus (Ehrenberg, 1831)
 Monacha obstructa (L. Pfeiffer, 1842)
 Monacha solitudinis (Bourguignat, 1852)
 Monacha syriaca (Ehrenberg, 1831)

Helicidae
 Cornu aspersum (O. F. Müller, 1774)
 Eobania vermiculata (O. F. Müller, 1774)
 Helix engaddensis (Bourguignat, 1852)

Sphincterochilidae
 Sphincterochila fimbriata (Bourguignat, 1852)

Freshwater bivalves

Sphaeriidae
 Musculium lacustre (O. F. Müller, 1774)
 Pisidium amnicum (O. F. Müller, 1774)
 Pisidium casertanum (Poli, 1791)
 Pisidium subtruncatum Malm, 1855
 Pisidium tenuilineatum Stelfox, 1918
 Pisidium personatum Malm, 1855

See also

 List of marine molluscs of Lebanon

Lists of molluscs of surrounding countries:
 List of non-marine molluscs of Israel
 List of non-marine molluscs of Syria

References

Molluscs, non-marine
Lebanon
Lebanon